The Academy of Sciences and Humanities in Hamburg (German: Akademie der Wissenschaften in Hamburg) is a German scientific society located in Hamburg.

Link
Academy webpages (in German)

Union of German Academies of Sciences and Humanities
Organisations based in Hamburg